Marie Laura Meza (born 20 November 1990 in San José) is a Costa Rican swimmer who competes in the Women's 100 metre butterfly. At the 2012 Summer Olympics she finished 42nd (last) overall in the heats in the Women's 100 metre butterfly and failed to reach the final.

She also competed at the 2015 Pan American Games and the 2016 Summer Olympics.

References

1990 births
Living people
Costa Rican female swimmers
Female butterfly swimmers
Olympic swimmers of Costa Rica
Swimmers at the 2012 Summer Olympics
Swimmers at the 2015 Pan American Games
Swimmers at the 2016 Summer Olympics
Pan American Games competitors for Costa Rica
20th-century Costa Rican women
21st-century Costa Rican women